Machwitz Kaffee is a German family owned coffee brand and a coffee roasting company in Hanover, Germany. Founded in Gdansk in 1883 as a consumer goods store. In 1919, the headquarter moved to Georgstrasse, Hanover as a specialty coffee shop. Walter Koch (1911–1998), bought the company in 1948 as a family business. From 1952 to 1956, Walter Koch was a member of the German Party in the City Council of Hanover and was Mexico's honorary consul for Lower Saxony for many years. In 1958, he bought and restored the Hehlen moated castle, which was built in the 16th century, in the style of the Weser Renaissance.

Controversies

Company Logo
The logo of the Machwitz Kaffee has been criticized as racist and degrading in the modern society, which recognizes of the use of euphemism regarding the history of European colonial African slave trade and African slaves is deeply unjust, insensitive and painful to people who suffered under it and to those who are the descendants of those who suffered under it. The company owner J. Koch has continued time and again to crudely defend the company logo by citing "upholding the company tradition" and dismissed the criticism. A tradition that traces back to the German colonial era, a time in which German companies profited ruthlessly through particularly violent and brutal use of slavery in Africa. The defense of keeping "tradition" over the criticism of antiquated Black minstrel characters in European company logos and advertisements has long been cited by other European companies as well, such as the logo of the Italian coffee company Lucaffé.

In 2017, an online petition started by a Hanover local alliance aiming to raise awareness of disenfranchised immigrants and people of color, decolonize Hannover, demanded that the company to change its insensitive colonial era ethnically stereotyping and prejudiced logo, which attracted over 1650 signatures. In 2018, the "Decolonize Hanover" initiative initiated an online petition entitled "Racist Logo: Open Letter to the Machwitz Coffee Roaster", which received over 1,600 signatures. The company did not comment on the petition. Since around 2020, a new logo without "Machwitz-Mohren" has been shown at the company's headquarters, while it is still used on the company's homepage.

References 

Coffee brands
German brands
Controversies in Germany
Blackface minstrel characters
Fictional slaves
Race-related controversies in advertising and marketing
Fictional African-American people
Stereotypes of African Americans
Ethno-cultural designations
Cultural appropriation
Race-related controversies
Coffee in Germany
Agriculture companies of Germany